Sara Frances Beysolow Nyanti (born 1968) is an international development expert and Liberian pastor. She has more than 20 years of professional experience. She has been a United Nations Assistant Secretary General since December 2021.

Early life and education
Nyanti is the oldest of seven children of Winston E. Beysolow and Frances Hayes. Her mother worked multiple jobs to support her children. She attended the College of West Africa and Cuttington University. She has a master's degree in public administration from the New Charter University in the United States and is completing a doctoral degree in transformational leadership.

Career
Nyanti held senior positions in the Liberian Ministry of Health from 1999 to 2003, including as Director of the National AIDS Control Program. She wrote the country's first grant to the Global Fund for money to combat malaria, HIV, and tuberculosis. During the conflict and transitional government periods, Nyanti worked for the United Nations in Liberia.

From 2005 to 2009, Nyanti worked for the UN in Nepal, before becoming UNICEF HIV/AIDS advisor to the representatives in Namibia and Kenya in 2009. She was head of the UNICEG office in Lagos from 2015 to 2015. She was UNICEF Representative in Gambia from 2015 to 2017 and in Yemen from 2019 to 2020. In January 2021, she was appointed Resident Coordinator for the UN in Nepal.

Nyanti was a key figure in the response to Nigeria's Ebola Virus Disease outbreak and has been a leader in the international response to the COVID-19 pandemic. Since 2019, she has been the highest ranking Liberian in the UN.

In November 2021, she moderated the second day of the Women Political Leaders' fourth annual Reykjavik Global Forum, noting the need for gender equality to move from policy to action.

In December 2021, UN Secretary-General António Guterres appointed Nyanti Deputy Special Representative, Resident Coordinator and Humanitarian Coordinator in South Sudan (UNMISS) and Resident Coordinator in South Sudan, succeeding Alain Noudéhou of Benin. The role is an Assistant Secretary General. Nyanti will be leading the UN's efforts in recovery and stabilization in the world's newest country.

Community service and activism
Nyanti is an ordained Reverend and a minister at the Zion Grove Baptist Church in Brewerville, outside Monrovia. In October 2020, she preached at the Liberia Baptist Missionary and Educational Convention and expressed her disappointment over the "conspicuous silence of denominations of various churches to stand up and speak against societal ills in Liberia. She has spoken out and written about sexual violence in Liberia.

In 2014, Nyanti founded an NGO, The Development Brokers, which operates the Social Movement for Change (SM4C) to change impoverished communities in Montserrado County. She has launched two Rainbow Community Learning Huts for adolescent girls in response to escalating rape cases, each accommodating 30 girls who are assisted with education and counselling.

In January 2021, Nyanti was appointed to the Board of the Center for Transparency and Accountability in Liberia (CENTAL), the national chapter of Transparency International.

Personal life
Nyanti is married to Stephen Joeboe Nyanti, and has children and grandchildren. She is a feminist and on her appointment with the UN in Nepal, named the many Liberian women who had inspired her.

Selected publications

References

Living people
1968 births
College of West Africa alumni
Cuttington University alumni
Liberian Baptists
Liberian Protestant clergy
Liberian women diplomats
Liberian officials of the United Nations
21st-century Liberian women
Liberian women's rights activists
UNICEF people